Chick is a nickname, often for Charles. It may refer to:

People

Sports
 Chick Autry (first baseman) (1885–1976), Major League Baseball player
 Chick Autry (catcher) (1903–1950), American Major League Baseball player
 Jimmy Childress (1932–2015), American football coach
 Chick Cray (1921–2008), English cricketer
 Chick Davies (1892–1973), American baseball player
 Charles Doak (1884–1956), American college baseball player and head coach
 Chick Evans Jr. (1890–1979), American amateur golfer and member of the World Golf Hall of Fame
 Chick Evans (coach) (1901–1976), American college football, basketball, and baseball coach
 Chick Fewster (1895–1945), Major League Baseball pitcher
 Chick Fraser (1873–1940), Major League Baseball pitcher
 Chick Fullis (1904–1946), Major League Baseball player
 Chick Fulmer (1851–1940), Major League Baseball player
 Chick Gandil (1888–1970), Major League Baseball player, ringleader of the players involved in the 1919 Black Sox scandal
 Chick Galloway (1896–1969), Major League Baseball player
 Chick Hafey (1903–1973), Hall-of-Fame Major League Baseball player
 Chick Halbert (1919–2013), American basketball player
 Chick Harbert (1915–1992), American PGA Tour golfer
 Chick Hearn (1916–2002), American sportscaster
 Chick Henderson (rugby union) (1930–2006), South African rugby union footballer and commentator
 Chick Jagade (1926–1968), American National Football League player
 Chick Jenkins (c. 1882–?), Welsh rugby union and professional rugby league footballer
 Chick King (1930–2012), Major League Baseball player
 Chick Lang (1905–1947), Canadian Hall-of-Fame jockey
 Chick Lathers (1888–1971), American baseball player
 Chick Maggioli (1922–2012), American National Football League player
 Chick Meehan (1893–1972), American college football player and coach
 Chick Reiser (1914–1996), American National Basketball Association player and coach
 Chick Robitaille (1879–1947), Major League Baseball pitcher
 Chick Shorten (1892–1965), Major League Baseball player
 Chick Stahl (1873–1907), Major League Baseball player
 Chick Tolson (1895–1965), Major League Baseball player
 Chick Young (born 1951), Scottish football journalist
 Chick Zamick (1926–2007), Canadian hockey player and coach

Arts and entertainment
 Arthur Everett Austin Jr. (1900–1957), American art museum director
 Chick Bullock (1898–1981), American vocalist
 Chick Chandler (1905–1988), American actor
 Chick Churchill (born 1946), keyboard player of the British rock band Ten Years After
 Chick Corea (1941–2021), American jazz pianist
 Chick Henderson (singer) (1912–1944), English singer
 Chick Morrison (1878–1924), American silent film actor
 Chick Strand (1931–2009), American experimental filmmaker
 Chick Webb (1905–1939), jazz drummer and band leader
 Chick Willis (1934–2013), American blues singer and guitarist

Other
Charles Thomas Chick Parsons, Jr. (1902–1988), American World War II naval officer and businessman
Frank Chick Tricker (died 1913), New York gangster in the 1910s

Fictional characters
the title character of the Franco-Belgian Western comic series Chick Bill
the title character of the radio program Chick Carter, Boy Detective, which was adapted into the 1946 film serial Chick Carter, Detective, played by Lyle Talbot
Chick Hicks, from the animated film Cars

See also 

 
 
Chic (nickname)
Chica (name)
Chicka (disambiguation)
Chickie (nickname)

Lists of people by nickname
Hypocorisms